Owch Tappeh (also Romanized as Uch-Tapa, Ūch Tappeh, and Uchtepe) is a village in Ijrud-e Bala Rural District, in the Central District of Ijrud County, Zanjan Province, Iran. At the 2006 census, its population was 705, in 184 families.

References 

Populated places in Ijrud County